Voluntary Sports Societies (VSS) of the USSR were the main structural parts of the universal sports and physical education (fitness) system, that existed in the USSR between 1935 and 1991, together with already well established Dinamo, society in cooperation with Army, Aviation, and Fleet (DOSAAF), and CSKA sports societies, all of which were classified as Departamental Sports Societies (DSS) of the USSR (DSS-USSR) (Russian: Ведомственное спортивное общество (BCO) CCCP, Vedomstvennoye Sportivnoye Obshchestvo SSSR (VSO SSSR)).

VSS united sporting people, offering hiking, mountaineering, boating, and various other sports.  Their goals were to develop mass physical culture and sports and to provide facilities and conditions for sports training and improvement in athletes' skills. Most of the VSS were governed by trade Unions and often were closely associated with a certain ministry (aircraft industry, food workers, tractor industry, KGB, Red Army, Soviet Air Force), with industries being state-funded. Twenty five million athletes were members of such societies in 1970.

One of the most important features of VSS were Children and Youth Sport Schools, which numbered 1,350 in the 1970s and 7,500 in 1987. Later some of them were reformed into more elite Olympic reserve schools. There were also specialized sport clubs, groups of improvement athletes' skills, etc. More than 50,000 trainers and instructors worked there in these institutions.

History

Background 
Already in the first half of 19th century sports schools, clubs, societies (sailing and rowing, fencing, swimming, ice skating, cycling, and others) appeared in Saint-Petersburg, Moscow, Kiev and other cities of the Russian Empire. The yacht clubs of Moscow and Saint-Petersburg figured among the first such societies. Along with the development of the sport societies, official sports competitions started. The Great Soviet Encyclopedia states that usually those sports clubs and unions were chartered and financed by representatives of the bourgeoisie and of the nobility, and that access to them for students and working youth "was extremely limited". At the end of the 19th and start of the 20th centuries there appeared workers' sports organizations across the cities of the Russian Empire. Prominent roles in the development of the Russian sport were played by the "Petersburg's Circle of Sports Enthusiasts" (established in 1889), the "" also known as RGO Sokol (1883, Moscow), the "Petersburg Society of Skating Enthusiasts" (1877), the "Circle of Athletic Enthusiasts" (1885, Petersburg), and others.

In 1896 the founder of a scientific system of fitness education, Pyotr Lesgaft (1837–1909), opened in Petersburg the courses of educators and leaders of physical education that eventually became a prototype of the higher-learning institutions in physical education established in the Soviet Union and abroad. In the beginning of the 20th century All-Russian unions on sports emerged and organized the first championships. In 1913 the  took place in Kiev where  some 600 people - including females - participated. The  followed the next year (1914) in Riga involving over 1,000 participants. The program of those Olympics consisted of light athletics, gymnastics, fencing, association football, tennis, heavy athletics, swimming, rowing, sailing, modern pentathlon, shooting, equestrian, and cycling.

In 1907 on decree of the Imperial Russian Prime Minister Pyotr Stolypin, the Russian Gymnastics Society was officially renamed as RGO Sokol and joined the Pan-Slavic Sokol movement (Sokolskoe dvizhennie). By 1910 it accounted for 60 cities in the Russian Empire that had their Sokol gymnastics societies.

The Russian Empire figured among the 12 countries, representatives of which, at the first international Olympic Congress in Paris in 1894, decided to revive the Olympics and established the International Olympic Committee. Sportsmen of the Russian Empire participated in the 1908 Olympics (5 members) and in the 1912 Olympics (174 members). In 1914 the Russian Empire had 1,200 sports unions involving some 45,000 participants out of some 332 cities and other settlements.

Soviet sport 
After the October Revolution of late 1917 state oversight of the workers' physical training was assigned to the Main Department of Vsevobuch (Universal Military Training) in 1918, following this  (VSFK)was established in 1920. In 1923 such VSFKs were set up for every Executive Committee of each Soviet region. In 1936 the council was reformed into the All-Union committee for fitness culture and sports affairs for the Council of People's Commissars of the USSR.

VSS Spartak, the first of the future Union-wide national sports societies, dates from 1935. The society united the workers of local industries, communal economy, culture, automobile transportation, civil aviation, and others. In the following years numerous other sport societies were set up throughout the Soviet Union. Some societies were closely associated with a single industry; others had associations with a combination of several. For example, athletes from factory schools and vocational schools were united into VSS Trudovye Rezervy in 1943. The formation of the kernel of the system was complete in the 1950s, when village VSS were established in all 16 of the then Soviet republics (including the Karelo-Finnish SSR until 1956).

Structure
The main structural units of VSS were physical culture collectives by the enterprises, public-service institutions, collective farms (kolkhoz), state farms (sovkhoz), educational institutions, etc. These collectives were primary organizations of VSS and numbered 114 thousands (including 105 thousands under Trade Unions), united into 36 VSS (29 of them were of Trade Unions) as of 1971. There were six All-Union VSS and 30 republican VSS – 15 united physical culture collectives of industrial enterprises and other 15 united rural collectives. Those were the standard societies. In 1982 all republican societies merged under the two Russian republican societies.

The Dynamo Sports Club, founded in 1923 by Felix Dzerzhinsky, represented the security services of the USSR, and were sponsored by them. The society had a special status. Another sports society was the "Sports club of the Armed Forces" (usually abbreviated as SKA - Sports Club of the Army). Like Dynamo, SKA also carried a special status, as they represented the athletes in their military service duty in the Soviet Armed Forces.

Beside those, there were also numerous other sport societies that preceded the above mentioned or were less represented such as Vympel (River transportation) and Moryak (Sea transportation) combined into Vodnik, Stakhanovets (Mining industry) changed into Shakhter, and others. There even was a society of DOSAAF which was a volunteer society in cooperation with the Army, Air Force, and  Navy (notice the combination of the last three letters) and a sister club to the SKA organization.

All-Union VSS

Republican VSS of industrial enterprises

Republican rural VSS

Reorganization in the 1980s
In 1982 the Presidium of the VTsSPS reorganized 33 Trade Unions' VSS. None were abolished, just the governing organization of most of them was changed from VTsSPS to another one. The eight largest Trade Unions' VSS remained under VTsSPS leadership: Burevestnik, Vodnik, Zenit, Lokomotiv, Spartak, Trud, Urozhai, FiS (English: fitness and sports). According to Soviet sources (which are questionable), these eight VSS united 48.365 million members. VSS that did not belong to Trade Unions were not reorganized.

In February 1987 all VSS were abolished by the VTsSPS. On the basis of eight Trade Unions' VSS, one All-Union Volunteer Fitness and Sports Society of Trade Unions was created. The rural VSS were also combined into a single All-Union rural VSS. Two national societies from athletes from all the Union Republics had already been formed on the basis of the 15 societies in 1982.

Other important VSSs

 Torpedo (automobile and truck manufacture industries)
 Traktor (Tractor manufacture industry)
 Strela (Subway workers of the Moscow Metro)
 Neftyanik (Oil industry)
 Energia  (energy and power industries)
 Stroitel (building industries)
 Start (transport drivers)
 Khimik (Chemical Industries)
 Metallurg (metals industries)
 Krasnaya Zvezda (Armed forces)
 Shakhter (Mining industry)
 Krilya Sovietov (Aircraft factories)
 Samolet (civil aviation)
 Chernomorets (Merchant marine and port workers)
 Sudostroitel (Ship manufacture and construction)
 Pishchevik (Food distribution and tobacco)
 Stalinets (Electrical machines)
 Zapolyarnik
 Tekstilschik (Textiles and clothing production)
 Krasnoe Znamya (Cotton industry)
 Monolit (Painters and paint manufacturers)
 Medik (Medical profession)
 Rekord (State-owned enterprises)
 Iskusstvo (visual and performing arts)

Governing body and its functions
The governing body of Trade Unions' VSS was the All-Union Council of Trade Unions' VSS, established and governed by VTsSPS since 1957.

The Council's main activities were:
to hold competitions between VSS, Spartakiads of Trade Unions, to arrange physical culture holidays
to support the participation of VSS in All-Union and international competitions
to control functioning of Children and Youth Sport Schools and other institutions
to lead construction of sports facilities
to award the best physical culture collectives the title Sport Club
to maintain relations with foreign workers' and students' sports unions

Reporting under the Council were federations of various sports disciplines, Coach Councils, and Judging Boards which functioned to assist its duties.

The SKA and Dynamo associations, which were manned by athletes in uniformed service in the armed forces and police, were under the direct supervision of the Ministries of Defense and Internal Affairs and were thus independent from the unions' sports societies.

Financing, facilities and symbols
VSS were financed mostly by trade unions and state (e.g. 355 million roubles in 1970). There were a lot of sports facilities constructed throughout the country using this means by 1970: 2,490 stadiums, 59,000 football grounds, 14,400 complex sports grounds, 10,200 artistic gymnastics halls, 950 artificial swimming pools, 270,000 grounds for sport games.

Each VSS had its own flag, emblem, sports uniform and pin. Societies, which were awarded orders (e.g. VSS Spartak - Order of Lenin) had their images on the flag and other symbols.

VSS at the Olympics
The most represented VSS at the Olympics usually were Spartak, Burevestnik, Trud, Zenit, Avangard. For example, from 409 competitors for the USSR at the 1976 Summer Olympics 58 were from Spartak, 48 from Burevestnik, 28 from Trud, 13 from Zenit and 11 from Avangard.

Controversy

According to the Olympic rules of the 20th century, only amateur athletes were eligible to participate. Top Soviet athletes were funded by the state and trained full-time but were listed in different VSS what allowed them to retain their amateur status. That created a disbalance in the international sports, and the IOC was prompted to drop outdated amateur rules and open the Olympics to all athletes, regardless of their status.

See also
Dynamo
CSKA
Ready for Labour and Defence of the USSR (GTO)
Vsevobuch
Sports club

References

External links
Sport flags of the Soviet Union
 Sport Flags of the USSR
 History of VSS Spartak
 Fitness culture and sport (USSR) in the Great Soviet Encyclopedia (1969-1978)

 
Multi-sport clubs in the Soviet Union